Kruszyniec may refer to the following places in Poland:
Kruszyniec, Lower Silesian Voivodeship (south-west Poland)
Kruszyniec, Kuyavian-Pomeranian Voivodeship (north-central Poland)